St. Charles' Church may refer to:

 St. Charles's Church, Vienna, Austria
 St. Charles's Church (Staten Island, New York), United States
 St. Charles Anglican Cathedral, Bremerton, Washington, United States
 St. Charles Church, Plymouth, Devon, England
 St. Charles' Church, Tallinn, Estonia
 Saint-Charles Church, Monaco, Monte Carlo district, Monaco

See also
 Charles Borromeo Church (disambiguation)
 Charles Church (disambiguation)
 Karlskirche (disambiguation)